Clarke is an unincorporated community in Morrow County, Oregon, United States. It lies east of Boardman between Interstate 84 to the south and U.S. Route 730 to the north.

References

Unincorporated communities in Morrow County, Oregon
Unincorporated communities in Oregon